Giraffa pygmaea is an extinct species of giraffe from Africa during the Pliocene, and died out during the Pleistocene about 0.781 million years ago.

References
Giraffa pygmaea Fossilworks.

Pliocene even-toed ungulates
Pleistocene even-toed ungulates
Pleistocene mammals of Africa
Prehistoric giraffes